Moviemiento - short films on the road is a travelling short film festival originating in Berlin.

Concept 

Moviemiento is a short film festival without a permanent venue. Instead cities and rural areas are visited along a given route. During the festival tour a documentary is produced and shown in the current program. Screenings are free of charge and generally take place in public space. Since 2008 besides film screenings the festival organizes other activities like workshops, film competitions and panel discussions. Often a festival tour has a specific subject. In the 2008 tour Moving Baltic Sea it was environmental protection. Kinomobilny in 2009 had bilateral exchange between Germany and Poland as a topic.

Festival tours and projects

References

External links 

 Official website Moviemiento – short films on the road
 Official website Moving Baltic Sea
 Official website Kinomobilny
 Official website Cinecita
 Official website temporary home 2012 - home in crisis

Film festivals in Berlin
Short film festivals